Petasina unidentata is a species of air-breathing land snail, a terrestrial pulmonate gastropod mollusk in the family Hygromiidae, the hairy snails and their allies.

Shell description

References

Petasina
Gastropods described in 1805